The Midland Continental Overpass near Jamestown, North Dakota is a steel cantilever beam bridge that was built in 1936.  It was listed on the National Register of Historic Places in 1997. The bridge crossed the Midland Continental Railroad track.

According to its nomination, the bridge is significant "for its association with efforts to modernize and improve North Dakota's roadway system during the New Deal era, including the state's first large-scale program of railroad-highway grade separation construction. The overpass is also eligible ... because it exhibits an unusual engineering design. The use of cantilevered spans during the historic
period, such as exhibited at this structure, is rare in North Dakota."  However, there are no records of the bridge's construction in county records.

References

Road bridges on the National Register of Historic Places in North Dakota
Bridges completed in 1936
National Register of Historic Places in Stutsman County, North Dakota
Steel bridges in the United States
Cantilever bridges in the United States
Transportation in Stutsman County, North Dakota
1936 establishments in North Dakota